Miguel Interllige (born 1956) is a team handball coach from Spain. He coaches the defenders of Argentina, such as at the 2011 World Women's Handball Championship in Brazil.

References
″

1956 births
Living people
Spanish handball coaches